Ardeer is a suburb in Melbourne, Victoria, Australia,  west of the Melbourne central business district, located within the City of Brimbank local government area.

Ardeer railway station is on the Serviceton railway line.

History

Ardeer Post Office opened on 1 December 1953 as suburban development took place and closed in 1979. Ardeer today is a small suburb split into two enclaves by Kororoit Creek. The area south of Forrest Street, previously known as Ardeer, was rezoned in the late 1990s to be incorporated into Sunshine West.

Facilities

Education 
 Ardeer Primary School
 Mother of God School

Religion
Bao Vuong Temple, a Vietnamese Buddhist temple, is located in the suburb.

Kororoit Creek

A section of the Kororoit Creek runs along the north and west border of Ardeer. The Kororoit Creek Trail contains wide open park space and native vegetation rarely seen so close to the [[Melbourne central business district].

In October 2007, John Brumby announced that funding would be provided to link the Kororoit Creek Trail to the Federation Trail, joining two western suburb bike paths.

Notable residents
 Brian Barnett OAM, herpetologist

See also
 City of Sunshine – Ardeer was previously within this former local government area.

References

Suburbs of Melbourne
Suburbs of the City of Brimbank